Norbert Thiede is an East German former Olympic discus thrower. He represented his country in the men's discus throw at the 1976 Summer Olympics. His distance was a 61.14 in the qualifiers, and a 64.30 in the finals.

References

Living people
1949 births
East German discus throwers
Olympic athletes of East Germany
Athletes (track and field) at the 1976 Summer Olympics
People from Perleberg
Sportspeople from Brandenburg